Marko Blagojević (born 20 April 1974) is a Serbian politician serving as minister of public investments since 2022.

Early life 
Marko Blagojević was born on 20 April 1974 in Belgrade, Socialist Republic of Serbia, Socialist Federal Republic of Yugoslavia. He graduated from the Faculty of Law at the University of Belgrade.

Career 
Blagojević was politically active through the 1990s. He took part in the 1996–1997 protests against Slobodan Milošević. In 1997, he co-founded CeSID, a non-governmental organisation; he was its member until 2014. He was a member of the board of directors of the Open Society Fund from 2003 to 2008. In 2014, the Government of Serbia named him the director of the Office for Relief and Reconstruction of Flooded Areas, while a year later he became the director of the Office for Public Investment Management. He has held the office since then.

Minister of Public Investments 
It was announced on 24 October 2022 that Blagojević would serve as minister of public investments in the third cabinet of Ana Brnabić. He was sworn in on 26 October.

Personal life 
Blagojević is married and has one daughter.

References 

1974 births
Living people
Politicians from Belgrade
Serbian Progressive Party politicians
University of Belgrade Faculty of Law alumni
Government ministers of Serbia
21st-century Serbian politicians
Independent politicians in Serbia